Tanya Hennessy (born 1985) is an Australian digital content creator, comedian, writer and television presenter who works in Australia. Hennessy taught drama and worked in theatre as a stage manager at the Edinburgh Festival Fringe before switching to a career in radio announcing. She worked for Southern Cross Austereo and the HIT Network commercial radio stations in Newcastle, Griffith, Toowoomba and Canberra.

She is best known for her comedy videos including Everyday Makeup Tutorial, Get A Real Job and Things People Say on Facebook, YouTube and Instagram, and as a celebrity competitor in the Australian version of I'm a Celebrity...Get Me Out of Here!

Career
Hennessy performed in the television series Drunk History Australia and The Unboxing, and appeared as herself in Hughesy, We Have a Problem, The Daily Talk Show and Chris & Julia's Sunday Night Takeaway.
Hennessy hosted The Bachelor: UNPACKED on Channel 10 and guest hosted on Studio 10 and The Loop.

Awards and nominations

Radio

Stage

Filmography

Podcasts

Books
 2018: Am I Doing This Right?: Life Lessons from the Encyclopedia Bri-Tanya by Tanya Hennessy
 2020: Help Self: Learn from my mistakes so you can make different ones! by Tanya Hennessy
 2021: Drum Roll Please, It's Stevie Louise by Tanya Hennessy

External links

References 

1985 births
Australian YouTubers
Australian radio presenters
Australian radio personalities
Living people
People from Newcastle, New South Wales
Australian women radio presenters
Australian women comedians